J.G. Melon is an American restaurant established in 1972. It is located at 1291 Third Avenue on the northeast corner of East 74th Street, on the Upper East Side of Manhattan in New York City. It is known for its hamburgers.

History 
J.G. Melon's building dates back to the 1920s, when a tavern was built by a local brewery to dispense its own products following Prohibition. The space was previously called Central Tavern.

J.G. Melon was established in 1972 by original owners Jack O'Neill and George Mourges, the "J" and "G" of J.G. Melon. Mourges died in 2000. The Mourges heirs are co-owners.

The restaurant's decor mostly consists of artwork depicting watermelons.

O'Neill and Mourges also operated a J.G. Melon restaurant in Bridgehampton, New York, in the 1970s and '80s and another J.G. Melon restaurant on Amsterdam Avenue which opened in 1977 and closed in January 1993. The West-side Melon's was larger than the East-side space and had a slightly larger menu with more entree selections. Like its East-side parent, it too had a large neighborhood following, and was a favorite haunt of actors and theatre patrons from the Promenade Theatre and the Second Stage Theatre.

A scene with Meryl Streep and Dustin Hoffman was filmed at the restaurant for the 1979 film Kramer vs. Kramer. There is also a scene in Whit Stillman's Metropolitan shot at J.G. Melon.

In July 2015 another satellite location was opened by Magnolia Bakery owner Steve Abrams, brother Danny, and 30-year Melon alum Shaun Young. Except for dessert, the menu is almost identical, including the guarded formula and source for the iconic hamburger.  The restaurant is located at 89 MacDougal Street in Greenwich Village.

In September 2017, a third location was opened at 480 Amsterdam Avenue on the Upper West Side, but has since closed.

In April 2019, a brief and largely non-cosmetic renovation of the original location was completed.

Notable frequenters 
Former New York City Mayor Michael Bloomberg, who calls J.G. Melon hamburgers the "best hamburgers in the world.” 
Food Network host Bobby Flay, who calls J.G. Melon the best hamburger joint in the city.
Restaurateur Danny Meyer, who lists J.G. Melon's hamburger as one of the best in New York City. 
Actor Dylan McDermott, whose father was a longtime J.G. Melon bartender.
 Model Gigi Hadid claimed J.G. Melon has the best burgers in New York during her interview on The Tonight Show Starring Jimmy Fallon.

See also

 List of hamburger restaurants

References

Hamburger restaurants in the United States
Restaurants established in 1972
Drinking establishments in Manhattan
Nightlife in New York City
Restaurants in Manhattan
Upper East Side
Third Avenue
1972 establishments in New York City